Chanra Bhanu Devi  was an Indian politician. She was elected to the Lok Sabha, the lower house of the Parliament of India from the Balia in Bihar as a member of the Indian National Congress.

References

External links
 Official biographical sketch in Parliament of India website

Indian National Congress politicians
India MPs 1984–1989
Lok Sabha members from Bihar
Women members of the Lok Sabha
1947 births
2008 deaths
Indian National Congress politicians from Bihar